The Kashmiri Wikipedia is the Kashmiri language edition of Wikipedia. It was launched in 2004. On 29 November 2021 it crossed 1000 articles mark.

History 
Kashmiri Wikipedia was started in 2004. The first edit was done on 25 March 2004 by an anonymous user who added Kashmir letters to Main page. This date is also celebrated as the Birthday of Kashmiri Wikipedia.

Users and editors

See also 

 Arabic Wikipedia
 Urdu Wikipedia
 Hindi Wikipedia
 Telugu Wikipedia

References

External links 

  Kashmiri Wikipedia (Mobile)

Wikipedias by language
Kashmiri-language encyclopedias 
Kashmiri-language websites
Wikipedia in India